Brazil cost refers to the increased operational costs associated with doing business in Brazil, making Brazilian goods and services more expensive compared to other countries. There are several factors that contribute to the extra cost, including:

 High levels of public deficits;
 The economy divided into cartels;
 Inefficiency of public services;
 Maintenance of high real interest rates;
 Exaggerated net interest spread of financial institutions (among the highest in the world);
 Excessive bureaucracy for importing and exporting, creating difficulties for foreign trade;
 Low education levels and lack of qualified labour;
 Excessive layers of bureaucracy (red tape), e.g., starting a company in Brazil takes at least 120 days;
 High levels of corruption within the public sector;
 High tax burden;
 Expensive labour costs;
 High social security costs;
 Complex and inefficient fiscal legislation;
 Economic instability;
 High electricity cost;
 Legal uncertainty;
 High interest rates;
 High crime rate, which adds extra security costs;
 Underdeveloped infrastructure, including a deteriorated network for domestic shipping by rail, highway and coastal navigation*.

*: In 2007 transport costs consumed 13% of GDP, 5% more than in the United States. The high transport costs are exacerbated by the scattering of industry over Brazil's vast territory.

See also
Licence Raj
Fakelaki

References

Finance in Brazil
Corruption in Brazil